Madeleine Ayinkamiye was a Rwandan politician. She was appointed Minister of Social Affairs in 1964, making her the first female cabinet minister in Rwanda.

Ayinkamiye served in ministerial office from 6 January 1964 to 8 November 1965. She was the only woman government minister in Rwanda between Rwanda's independence in 1962 and April 1992.

References

Year of birth missing
Possibly living people
Social affairs ministers of Rwanda
Women government ministers of Rwanda
20th-century Rwandan women politicians
20th-century Rwandan politicians